Amos 7 is the seventh chapter of the Book of Amos in the Hebrew Bible or the Old Testament of the Christian Bible. This book contains the prophecies attributed to the prophet Amos; in particular, the seventh, eighth, and ninth chapters contain visions and their explanations. It is a part of the Book of the Twelve Minor Prophets.

Text 
The original text was written in Hebrew language. This chapter is divided into 17 verses.

Textual witnesses
Some early manuscripts containing the text of this chapter in Hebrew are of the Masoretic Text tradition, which includes the Codex Cairensis (895), the Petersburg Codex of the Prophets (916), Aleppo Codex (10th century), Codex Leningradensis (1008). Fragments cumulatively containing all verses of this chapter in Hebrew were found among the Dead Sea Scrolls including 4Q78 (4QXIIc; 75–50 BCE) with extant verses 1–16; 4Q82 (4QXIIg; 25 BCE) with extant verses 1, 7–12, 14–17; DSS F.Amos1 (DSS F.181; 1–30 CE) with extant verse 17; and Wadi Murabba'at (MurXII; 75–100 CE) with extant verses 3–6, 8–17.

There is also a translation into Koine Greek known as the Septuagint, made in the last few centuries BCE. Extant ancient manuscripts of the Septuagint version include Codex Vaticanus (B; B; 4th century), Codex Alexandrinus (A; A; 5th century) and Codex Marchalianus (Q; Q; 6th century).

Verse 8

 And the Lord said unto me,
 Amos, what seest thou?
 And I said, A plumbline.
 Then said the Lord,
 Behold, I will set a plumbline in the midst of my people Israel: 
  will not again pass by them any more:
 "Amos, what seest thou?" God calls the prophet by name, as a familiar friend, just as He said to Moses, "I know you by name" , . For "the Lord knows them that are His".
 "Plumbline" or "plumb bob"; "plummet": a tool to measure not only for building, but also for pulling down (see ;), which should be done "in the midst" of the people, that all might be tried individually, and that all might acknowledge the justice of the sentence, which is a complete ruin. The Vulgate Latin version renders it, "a plasterer's" or "mason's trowel"; with which they lay their plaster and mortar on in building: the Septuagint translates as "an adamant": and which, by Pliny, is called "anachites"; a word in sound near to this here used: the Targum renders it, "judgment": but Jarchi and Aben Ezra observe, that in the Arabic tongue it signifies "lead" or "tin", and thus "a line with lead at the end of it".
 "Not … pass by … any more": "not forgive them any more".

See also

Related Bible parts: Amos 1, Amos 2, Amos 8, Amos 9

Notes

References

Sources

External links

Jewish
Amos 7 Hebrew with Parallel English
Amos 7 Hebrew with Rashi's Commentary

Christian
Amos 7 English Translation with Parallel Latin Vulgate

07